, also known as  or simply , is a Japanese vocalist and idol. She is a former member of CY8ER, Bis, Akishibu Project and Strawberry Syndrome.

Career

2010–2014: BiS and Akishibu Project 
On 25 October 2010, Rina Yokoyama was revealed to be one of the four founding members of new idol group Bis, under the stage name ヨコヤマリナ, which is her name written in katakana. As a member, Yokoyama Rina participated in Bis' debut single, and their debut album, Brand-new idol Society. In June 2011, Yokoyama decided to leave the group due to her disagreements with the direction the group was taking. She then worked as a model to the now-defunct fashion magazine Nicky under her name written in kanji.

On 5 October 2012, Yokoyama announced that she was creating a new idol group named Akishibu Project with the aim of "merging the cultures of Shibuya with Akihabara." During this time, she went by the stage name . Originally composed of Rinahamu and two other members, the group expanded and held regular performances at Twinbox Akihabara. Rinahamu left the group on 11 May 2014, and a graduation concert was held in her honor. She also attended BiS' dissolution concert on 8 July 2014.

2014–present: solo career, CY8ER, and Strawberry Syndrome 
On 15 September 2014, she once again changed her stage name to Ichigo Rinahamu and held a concert at AkibaArena, a maid café, where she announced the release of a self-titled single on 15 October. She said that if 5,000 singles aren't sold within three months, she would retire as an idol. Then, on 3 December 2014, she paired up with Yōnapi from the band You'll Melt More! to release the single . On 1 May 2015, she released the single .

On 31 May 2015, Ichigo Rinahamu announced that she would pair with Nicamoq, a DJ, to create a new idol group named "BPM15Q", which would later become CY8ER. On 16 August 2015, she released a solo single, in response to an alleged 2014 image that showed her littering on a train.

Ichigo Rinahamu also created a short-lived band named , which was founded on 23 April 2016. She was the vocalist of the band. The group had a total of seven members and produced one single, a remake of the vocaloid song  by Junky, released on 28 June 2016. A five-member subunit managed by Ichigo Rinahamu called Doping Berry was created on 10 August 2016. Both were disbanded on 13 July 2017.

In April 2021, Ichigo Rinahamu announced that she would be holding auditions for an idol group that she would produce. The group debuted as HO6LA in October 2021.

Discography

Singles

As Strawberry Syndrome

As featured artist

References 

Living people
Musicians from Kanagawa Prefecture
Japanese idols
1992 births